Les Anderson (17 April 1910 – 10 July 1949) was an American racecar driver. He was killed in a two car collision with Art George at the Portland Speedway. Anderson was taken to the Emanuel Hospital without regaining consciousness. He died at 7:30 pm the same evening. Art George survived the accident.

Indy 500 results

References

External links
 

1910 births
1949 deaths
Racing drivers from Chicago
Indianapolis 500 drivers
Racing drivers who died while racing
Sports deaths in Oregon